Roger Charles Bush is an Anglican priest who is the present Dean of Truro.

He was born on 22 November 1956 and educated at King's College London, Leeds University and the College of the Resurrection, Mirfield. He was ordained in 1987 and was a curate at Newbold, Derbyshire before becoming a team vicar in the Parish of the Resurrection, Leicester, and then Rector of Redruth, Cornwall. He was a canon residentiary at Truro Cathedral from 2004 to 2006,
when he became Archdeacon of Cornwall. On 22 September 2012, he was instituted Dean of Truro.

Bush is to retire at the end of September 2022.

References
 

1956 births
Alumni of King's College London
Alumni of the University of Leeds
Alumni of the College of the Resurrection
Deans of Truro
Living people
Archdeacons of Cornwall